Lahde or Lähde may refer to 
Lahde, surname
Lähde, a shopping mall in Rajamäki, Nurmijärvi, Finland
Tarinain lähde, a 1974 poetry collection by Aale Tynni
Petershagen-Lahde railway station in Germany